Grace Lutheran Church of Barber is a site on the National Register of Historic Places in Golden Valley County, Montana. The church  was added to the Register on February 1, 1982.

Grace Lutheran Church is located on U.S. Route 12  approximately seven miles west of the town  of Ryegate.   
Grace Lutheran of Barber was organized in 1911. Methodists built the church at Barber in 1917. The wooden structure was shared by both Methodist and Lutheran congregations for many years. In 1927, the Lutheran congregation purchased the church and the Methodist congregation relocated to Ryegate.  The church is still being used for religious services.

References

External links

Grace Lutheran ELCA (Montana Church Directory)

Churches on the National Register of Historic Places in Montana
Lutheran churches in Montana
National Register of Historic Places in Golden Valley County, Montana
1911 establishments in Montana
Churches completed in 1911